Pavel Sergeyevich Dorokhin (born 18 September 1984) is a former Russian professional football player.

Club career
He played six seasons in the Russian Football National League for four different teams.

External links
 

1984 births
Footballers from Voronezh
Living people
Russian footballers
Association football midfielders
FC Lada-Tolyatti players
FC Baltika Kaliningrad players
FC Salyut Belgorod players
FC Ufa players
FC Mordovia Saransk players
FC Taganrog players
FC Dynamo Makhachkala players